This is an alphabetical list of notable jazz vocalists.

A

B

C

D

E

F

G

H

I  
 James Ingram (1952–2019)

J

K

L

M

N

O

P

Q 
 Ray Quinn (born 1988)

R

S

T

V

W

Z 
 Linnzi Zaorski (born 1978)
 Lena Zavaroni (1963–1999)
 Monica Zetterlund (1937–2005)

See also

Lists of musicians

References

External links

Vocalists
Vocalists